Blu Greenberg (born January 21, 1936, in Seattle, with the name Bluma Genauer, later legally changing her first name to Blu) is an American writer specializing in modern Judaism and women's issues. Her most noted books are On Women and Judaism: A View from Tradition (1981), and Black Bread: Poems, After the Holocaust (1994).

She has a B.A. in political science from Brooklyn College, an MA in clinical psychology from the City University of New York, and an MS in Jewish history from Yeshiva University. She is married to Irving Greenberg, who is also a well-known author and professor.

Greenberg is active in the movement to bridge Judaism and feminism. In February 1973, she gave the opening address at the first National Jewish Women's Conference, which was held in New York City. In 1997 and 1998, she chaired the first and second International Conference on Feminism and Orthodoxy, and she is the founder and the first president of the Jewish Orthodox Feminist Alliance. She has also tried to build bridges between women of different faiths by helping to set up "Women of Faith", and by her involvement in the "Dialogue Project", which seeks to unite Jewish and Palestinian women. She has lectured at universities and to Jewish communities in the United States and elsewhere. She also created the famous saying, "Where there's a rabbinic will, there's a halakhic way."

She received the Woman Who Made A Difference award on January 26, 2000, from the American Jewish Congress Commission for Women's Equality during a ceremony at the Israeli Knesset in Jerusalem.

Blu Greenberg's papers and her audiovisual collection are held at the Arthur and Elizabeth Schlesinger Library on the History of Women in America, a research library at the Radcliffe Institute for Advanced Study, Harvard University.

Publications
(2004) Chapter 16 of Transforming the Faiths of our Fathers: Women who Changed American Religion. Edited by Ann Braude.  
(2000) Orthodox Feminism and the Next Century. Sh'ma: A Journal of Jewish Responsibility. Vol.30/no.568.
(1998) King Solomon and Queen of Sheba. Pitspopany Press; Book & Toy edition: 
(1994) Black Bread: Poems, After the Holocaust. Ktav Publishing House. 
(1992) Is Now the Time for Orthodox Women Rabbis?. Moment Dec. 1992: 50-53, 74.
(1985) How to Run a Traditional Jewish Household. Fireside. 
(1984) Will There Be Women Rabbis?. Judaism 33.1 (Winter 1984): 23-33.
(1981) On Women and Judaism: A View from Tradition. Jewish Publication Society of America. 
(1976) Feminism: Is It Good for the Jews?. Hadassah, April 1976.
(1974) Abortion--We Need Halachic Creativity. Sh'ma: A Journal of Jewish Responsibility. Vol.5/no.81.

See also
Jewish feminism
Role of women in Judaism
Jewish Orthodox Feminist Alliance
 Ms. (magazine)#Advertising policy (about a 2008 incident that Greenberg commented on)

References

External links
Greenberg profile on Beliefnet
Blu Greenberg, b.1936 article at the Jewish Women's Archive
"Orthodox, Feminist, and Proud of it", Belief.net, undated, retrieved January 27, 2006
Articles by Blu Greenberg on the Berman Jewish Policy Archive @ NYU Wagner
Short biography of Greenberg (among other board members) on the website of the Jewish Orthodox Feminist Alliance

1936 births
American feminists
American Orthodox Jews
Jewish American writers
Orthodox Jewish feminists
American Jewish theologians
Living people
Brooklyn College alumni
Graduate Center, CUNY alumni
Yeshiva University alumni
Women Jewish theologians
Jewish ethicists
21st-century American Jews